Dan Patrick may refer to:
 Dan Patrick (ice hockey) (born 1938), Canadian ice hockey player
 Dan Patrick (politician) (born 1950), Lieutenant Governor of Texas and political and sports radio journalist
 Dan Patrick (sportscaster) (born 1956), American sportscaster and radio personality.

See also 
 Danny Patrick (director) (born 1972), British film director and screenwriter
 Danny Patrick (politician) (1941–2009), American politician
 Danica Patrick (born 1982), American race car driver
 Dan-Patrick Poggenberg (born 1992), German footballer